Fred Walter Marti (born November 15, 1940) is an American professional golfer.

Marti was born in Houston, Texas. He played college golf at the University of Houston with Homero Blancas, Dick Crawford, Babe Hiskey, Rocky Thompson, and Kermit Zarley. He was a member of the 1962 team that went undefeated and won the NCAA Division I Championship.

Marti turned professional in 1964. He played the PGA Tour from 1964 to 1980. His best finishes were a trio of second places: 2nd at the 1971 Kaiser International Open Invitational, 2nd at the 1972 Colonial National Invitation, and 2nd at the 1978 Ed McMahon-Jaycees Quad Cities Open. His best finish in a major was a T-9 at the 1971 PGA Championship.

After retiring from the PGA Tour in 1980, Marti replaced Homero Blancas as the head golf professional at Silverbell Golf Course in Tucson, Arizona. He was recognized by the Southwest Section of the PGA as Teacher of the Year in 1989. In 1996, Marti returned to his hometown of Baytown, Texas after accepting the head professional position at Evergreen Point Golf Course. Though retired, he continues to coach PGA Tour player Shawn Stefani.

Professional wins
this list may be incomplete
1971 United Air Lines-Ontario Open (unofficial PGA Tour event)
1981 Arizona Open

References

External links

American male golfers
Houston Cougars men's golfers
PGA Tour golfers
Golfers from Houston
1940 births
Living people